Martin J. "Marty" Moylan (born 1951) is the Illinois state representative for the 55th district. The 55th district includes all or parts of Arlington Heights, Des Plaines, Elk Grove Village, Park Ridge and the Edison Park Neighborhood.

As of July 3, 2022, Representative Moylan is a member of the following Illinois House committees:

 Business & Innovation Subcommittee (HLBR-BUIN)
 Cities & Villages Committee (HCIV)
 Labor & Commerce Committee (HLBR)
 Natural Gas Subcommittee (HPUB-NGAS)
 Police & Fire Committee (SHPF)
 Public Utilities Committee (HPUB)
 (Chairman of) Roadways, Rail & Aviation Subcommittee (HTRR-ROAD)
 (Chairman of) Transportation: Regulation, Roads & Bridges Committee (HTRR)

Personal life
Marty Moylan was named after his father and grandfather and great grandfather, all named Martin. He is the father of Martin "Colt" Moylan V and grandfather of Martin "Jaxx" Moylan VI. Colt Moylan was elected to the Des Plaines city council in 2019, assuming the position once held by Marty Moylan before being elected Mayor and State Representative.

Electoral history

References

External links
 Marty Moylan Legislative Website
Representative Martin J. Moylan (D) 55th District at the Illinois General Assembly
By session: 98th
Marty Moylan for State Representative
 
Rep. Marty Moylan at Illinois House Democrats
2012 Candidate profile at the Daily Herald

1952 births
Living people
Democratic Party members of the Illinois House of Representatives
Mayors of places in Illinois
People from Des Plaines, Illinois
21st-century American politicians